Under Illefarn is a Dungeons & Dragons module. It was the first module designed for use with the Forgotten Realms campaign setting and officially labeled as such.

Plot summary
Under Illefarn is a Forgotten Realms adventure scenario designed for beginning players in which the player characters are residents of Daggerford, and as members of the town militia and required to deal with lizardmen marauders, saving a kidnapped noblewoman, and protecting a caravan.

Publication history
N5 Under Illefarn was written by Steve Perrin, with a cover by Jeff Easley and interior illustrations by Luise Perenne, and was published by TSR in 1987 as a 48-page booklet with an outer folder.

Reception

References

Dungeons & Dragons modules
Forgotten Realms adventures
Role-playing game supplements introduced in 1987